Matteuccia is a genus of ferns with one species: Matteuccia struthiopteris (common names ostrich fern, fiddlehead fern, or shuttlecock fern). The species epithet struthiopteris comes from Ancient Greek words  "ostrich" and  "fern", so named for the large spore bearing structures resembling ostrich feathers.

Description
Along with Dryopteris goldieana, it is one of the largest species of fern in eastern North America.

Classification
Matteuccia struthiopteris is the only species in the genus Matteuccia. Some sources include two Asian species, M. orientalis and M. intermedia, but molecular data shows that M. struthiopteris is more closely related to Onocleopsis and Onoclea (sensitive fern) than it is to M. orientalis and M. intermedia, and so the latter should be moved to a genus Pentarhizidium which contains those two species. Formerly classified as a member of the Dryopteridaceae, Matteuccia has been reassigned to the new much smaller family Onocleaceae.

Distribution
It is a crown-forming, colony-forming plant, occurring in temperate regions of the Northern Hemisphere in central and northern Europe, northern Asia, and northern North America. It grows from a completely vertical crown, favoring riverbanks and sandbars, but sends out lateral stolons to form new crowns. It can thus form dense colonies resistant to destruction by floodwaters.

Cultivation and uses

The ostrich fern is a popular ornamental plant in gardens. It has gained the Royal Horticultural Society's Award of Garden Merit. While choosing a place of planting it should be taken into account that this fern is very expansive and its leaves often lose their beauty throughout the summer, especially if not protected from wind and hail.

The tightly wound immature fronds, called fiddleheads, are also used as a cooked vegetable, and are considered a delicacy mainly in rural areas of northeastern North America. It is considered inadvisable to eat uncooked fiddleheads. Brown "scales" are inedible and should be scraped or rinsed off.

The sprouts are also picked all over Japan, ("kogomi" in Japanese) where they are a delicacy.

Matteuccia species are used as food plants by the larvae of some Lepidoptera species including Sthenopis pretiosus.

References

Sources

Hyde, H. A., Wade, A. E., & Harrison, S. G. (1978). Welsh Ferns. National Museum of Wales.

Polypodiales
Ferns of Asia
Ferns of the Americas
Ferns of Europe
Ferns of the United States
Flora of Asia
Flora of Europe
Flora of North America
Leaf vegetables
Perennial vegetables
Japanese vegetables
Garden plants of Asia
Garden plants of Europe
Garden plants of North America
Monotypic fern genera